This is an incomplete list of ghost towns in Ohio.

 Ai (Fulton County) - partially abandoned ghost city
 Alba (Hancock County)
 Ashery (Hancock County) - small family town in Amanda Township
 Atwood (Carroll County) - small town in Carroll County. Abandoned to make way for Atwood Lake in effort to control flooding
 Atwood (Summit County) - small town in southern Summit County.
 Bakdwin (Paulding County) - small lumber town, slightly spills into Indiana
 Beagle (Hancock County) - small farming town
 Big Lick (Hancock County) - small town without notable buildings or businesses in Biglick Township 
 Blanchard Bridge (Hancock County) - small town in Amanda Township 
 Blowville
 Bakdwin (Paulding County) - small lumber town, slightly spills into Indiana
 Blue Ball
 (Boston) - also known as "Helltown"
 Cannonsburg (Hancock County) - small town in Union Township
 Capernaum (Hancock County) - small town named after biblical city in Amanda Township 
 Cass (Hancock County) - small town in Cass Township 
 Claylick, Licking County Located at the intersection of Claylick and the Licking River, this was one of the largest towns to be destroyed and caused primarily by 2 floods 1 in 1919 and 1 in 1959. After the 2nd flood the Dillon Dam floodplain project destroyed this town.
 Clements (Hancock County) - small town in Eagle and Jackson Township 
 Cordelia (Hancock County) - small town in Orange Township, named Cordelta on some Railroad maps 
 Crow (Hancock County) - small town in Marion Township 
 Delaware Town, Ohio - is a ghost town  in Coshocton County, Ohio
 El Rose (Hancock County) - small town in Orange Township with Rail station but not much business 
 Elk Lick (Destroyed and flooded after construction of William H. Harsha Lake)
 Elm Grove (Hancock County) - small town in Marion Township 
 Erwings Corner (Hancock County) - small town in Jackson Township 
 Frankford (Hancock County) - small town in Cass Township with 72 lots that were never sold
 Freedom (Hancock County) - small town in Biglick Township
 Galatea
 Hassan (Hasson) (Hancock County) - small town in Orange and Van Buren Township
 Hibernia
 Homer
 Huber (Hancock County) - small town on the Big Four Railroad in Marion Township 
 Ingham
 Jamestown (Hancock County) - small town in Amanda Township 
 Knockemstiff
 Lafayette (Hancock County) - small town in Portage Township 
 Langan (Hancock County) - small town in Orange Township with a short-lived train station 
 Lewisville (Hancock County) - small town in Blanchard Township
 Marion (Hancock County) - small town in Marion Township 
 Martinstown (Martins Town) (Hancock County) - small town in Eagle, Jackson and Madison Township 
 Marvins Mill (Hancock County) - small town in Marion Township 
 Moffitt (Hancock County) - small town in Blanchard Township 
 Moonville
 Moscow (Licking County)
 New Burlington (Clinton County)
 New Hampton
 Newville
 North Ridgeville (aka "North Ridge", "Pickens Corner", "Pickensville") (Hancock County) - small town in Marion Township 
 Olney (Hancock County) - small town in Pleasant Township 
 Oreton
 Providence
 Reed's Corner (Hancock County) - small town in Orange Township
 Revenge
 Rumley
 Rural Hill (Once thriving, died after local slaughter house, the main employer, closed its doors)
 San Toy
 Sprucevale (Canal town abandoned in 1870 with the closing of the canal, whose locks are still present)
 Tadmor
 Utopia
 Waterloo (Hancock County) - small town in Madison Township 
 Weidlers (Hancock County) - small town in Marion Township 
 West Union (Hancock County) - small town in Madison Township 
 Willow Creek (Hancock County) - small town in Eagle Township 
 Winchester
 Wineland (Hancock County) - small town in Cass Township 
 Wonderland

Notes and references

 
Ohio
Ghost towns